Kwabena Owusu Aduomi (born 17 September 1960) is a Ghanaian politician and a Member of Parliament of Ghana. He is a member of the New Patriotic Party (NPP) and the deputy minister for Roads and Highways in Ghana.

Early life 
Aduomi was born on 17 September 1960 in  Ejisu-Besease, Ashanti Region of Ghana.

Personal life 
Aduomi identifies as a Christian and a member of the Assemblies of God Church. He is married with six children.

Education 
He earned his bachelors of science degree in civil engineering at Kwame Nkrumah University of Science and Technology in 1985.

Career 
Aduomi became a maintenance engineer at the highway authority in Temale in 1987–1994, then proceeded to be a projects manager at highway authorities in the western region in 1994–2002. He became the regional director for highways in the Ashanti region in 2002–2008. He then became a member of the 6th parliament of the 4th republic of Ghana.

Political life 
He was elected as MP for Ejisu Constituency in the Ashanti Region of Ghana in 2009. He was selected to join the subsidiary legislation committee and the Local Government and Rural Development Committee.

References

Ghanaian MPs 2009–2013
Ghanaian MPs 2013–2017
Living people
New Patriotic Party politicians
Government ministers of Ghana
1960 births